The 2007 Mid-American Conference men's basketball tournament was won by No. 4 seed Miami University over No. 2 University of Akron 53–52 after a controversial finish.  Miami guard Doug Penno banked in a three-point field goal with no time left on the clock to give Miami an apparent one-point victory.  However, after a ten-minute delay, officials put 0.6 seconds back on the clock because the game clock did not start properly when Miami rebounded an Akron missed free throw.  Because of the win in the conference tournament final, Miami was awarded the Mid-American Conference's automatic berth into the 2007 NCAA Men's Division I Basketball Tournament.

The tournament took place from March 7–10 at Quicken Loans Arena in Cleveland.  This was the first year that the entire tournament was held in Cleveland.  In previous tournaments the first-round games were played at the higher seeds' home courts.  Comcast Local and FSN Ohio televised the Quarterfinals and Semifinals while ESPN2 broadcast the tournament championship.

All-tournament team
 Romeo Travis, Akron
 Jeremiah Wood, Akron
 Giordan Watson, Central Michigan
 Tim Pollitz, Miami (Tournament MVP)
 Michael Bramos, Miami

Format
Each of the 12 men's basketball teams in the MAC received a berth in the conference tournament.  Teams were seeded by conference record with the following tie-breakers:
 Head-to-head competition
 Winning percentage vs. ranked conference teams (top to bottom, regardless of division, vs. common opponents regardless of the number of times played)
 Coin flip

The top four seeds received byes into the Quarterfinals.  The winners of each division were awarded the No. 1 and No. 2 seeds.  The team with the best record of the two received the No. 1 seed.

Seeding
The following were the seeds for the conference tournament, along with conference record.
 Toledo, 14–2
 Akron, 13–3
 Kent State, 12–4
 Miami, 10–6
 Ohio, 9–7 *
 Western Michigan, 9–7
 Central Michigan, 7–9
 Eastern Michigan, 6–10
 Ball State, 5–11
 Buffalo, 4–12 **
 Northern Illinois, 4–12
 Bowling Green, 3–13

* Received No. 5 seed based on 78–73 head-to-head victory over Western Michigan on February 6.
** Received No. 10 seed based on 80–74 head-to-head victory over Northern Illinois on February 3.

Bracket

See also
 Mid-American Conference men's basketball tournament

External links
 MAC Tournament Central

References

Tournament
Mid-American Conference men's basketball tournament
MAC men's basketball tournament
MAC men's basketball tournament
Basketball in Cleveland